Aytos, sometimes written Aitos and Ajtos, is a town located in eastern Bulgaria some 30 kilometers from the Bulgarian Black Sea Coast and belonging to the administrative boundaries of Burgas Province. It is the administrative centre of the homonymous Aytos Municipality. As of December 2021, the town has a population of 18974 inhabitants.

History
Aytos has a rich and long history dating back to antiquity. Founded by Thracian tribes, archaeological finds near the town testify that its existence dates back to the 5th century BC. Throughout the centuries, the town has been known under different names including Aetòs (in Greek Αετός meaning eagle), Astòs (Αστός), Eidos (Είδος), Aquilia, Tchengis, etc.

During the reign of Khan Tervel, the region was incorporated in the Bulgarian Empire for the first time. The fortress Aetos took an important part in the defensive system of the Bulgarian lands against the sudden attacks of the Tatars, the Avars and the Crusaders.

In 1206, Aytos together with many cities in Bulgarian province of Thrace was destroyed by the Crusaders, led by Henry of Flanders. Henry of Flanders was a brother of Baldwin I, emperor of Latin Empire of Constantinople. A fortified city was rebuilt at 1488.

In 1378 the town was conquered by the armies of the Ottoman Empire under Murad I. During the Russian-Turkish War (1828–1829), General Hans Karl von Diebitsch turned the town into a strategic strong point. After the Treaty of Edirne in 1829, many of the town's citizens fled to Bessarabia to join the Bessarabian Bulgarians.

During the Bulgarian National Revival the population participated in the Bulgarian struggles for liberation. Vasil Levski organized a revolutionary committee in the town.

After the Liberation, Aytos became a commercial center, reputedly more important than Burgas. The first girls' agricultural school in the country was established in Aytos during the period.

Transport 
The geographic location determines the special significance of the municipality as a transport junction, where the road networks between Northern Bulgaria and Southern Bulgaria in this part of the country join. Important highways and the railway from Sofia to Burgas pass through it. Its good transport characteristics are also determined by the fact that it is only 28 km from Burgas, a key Black Sea port.

Geography
The town is located in eastern Bulgaria some 30 kilometers from the Bulgarian Black Sea Coast and belonging to the administrative boundaries of Burgas Province.

Climate

Culture 
The town hosts the annual folk festival and competition Slaveevi Noshti, which takes place every Spring during the months of May and June. The festival is held at the "Slaveeva Reka" Recreational Park and it celebrates traditional dance and folk music from across Bulgaria.

Demography
The town of Aytos has 18,974 inhabitants as of December 2021. Most inhabitants are ethnic Bulgarians (68%), followed by large Turkish (17%) and Roma minorities (14%).

Sports 
Established in the early '50s, the famous Aytos Sports Academy “Vihar” has produced many national and international gymnastics champions including three-time international champion Silviya Kostova. The Academy has a soccer team as well -- "Vihar Aytos".

Recreation and tourism

Natural landmarks 
 Recreation Park "Slaveeva Reka" ("Nightingale's River") — Few towns in Bulgaria can boast parks as big as "Slaveeva Reka" park. The park also hosts the Aytos Animal Zoo.
 Rock Formation "Trite Bratya" ("The Three Brothers")
 Natural Reserve "Kazanite"
 Natural Reserve "Hisarya"
 State Forest "Koriata"

Historical landmarks 
 Ancient Fortress "Aetos"
 Aitoski Historical Pass — Connecting the ancient lands of Thrace and Moesia
 St. Dimitrii Solunski Orthodox Church
 Aitos Mineral Baths

Cultural landmarks 
 Ethnographic Complex "Genger" — A small Etara-like ethnographic center built in the traditional local architectural style. The complex has a variety of different traditional Bulgarian arts and crafts shops as well as a traditional hotel, taverns, cafes and restaurants.
 Museum of "Peter Stanev"
 Theater "Vasil Levski"

Notable people 
 Ivana (singer) — Singer
 Vladimir Nenov — Filmmaker
 Eva Kirilova — Singer from Tonika
 Filip Kutev — Composer and founder of the Bulgarian National Ensemble & Choir
 Zhivko Mutafchiev — Painter
 Panayot Panayotov — Singer
 Pencho Peev — Poet
 Marie George Pepper - Psychotherapist, Cambridge, England
 Georgi Popgeorgiev — Painter and founder of the Young Bulgarian Painters Society
 Petar Stanev  — Painter
 Hristo Tanev — Sculptor
 Yovi Tenev — Federal Prosecutor for the United States Department of Justice
 Sava Tanev — Sculptor
 Tatyana Yotova — Poet
 Rositsa Zhivkova
 Ivan Angelov — Music Idol Star

Honour
Aytos Point on Livingston Island in the South Shetland Islands, Antarctica is named for Aytos.

References

External links 
 Official Site of Aitos Municipality
 EcoTrail Aitos - Official Tourism Site

Populated places established in the 5th century BC
Populated places in Burgas Province
Towns in Bulgaria